Alijah Holder (born January 26, 1996) is an American football safety for the Seattle Sea Dragons of the XFL. He played college football at Stanford.

College career
Holder played as a cornerback for the Stanford Cardinals. He did not play during his freshman year in 2014. Holder's first active season was played during his sophomore year in 2015; before he missed nine games due to injury during his junior year in 2016. After recovery, Holder played only four games during his junior year. During his senior year in 2017, Holder was named part of the Pac-12 All-Academic second-team. He played a fifth season in 2018, starting 10 of 12 games. Holder earned honorable mention in the 2018 All-Pac-12. He also became a three-time Pac-12 All-Academic. While at Stanford, Holder majored in media studies.

Professional career

Denver Broncos
Holder signed with the Denver Broncos as an undrafted free agent on May 2, 2019. He was waived on August 31, 2019, and re-signed to the practice squad. He was promoted to the active roster on December 17, 2019.

On September 5, 2020, Holder was waived by the Broncos, but was signed to the practice squad the next day. He was elevated to the active roster on November 7, November 21, November 28, and December 5 for the team's weeks 9, 11, 12, and 13 games against the Atlanta Falcons, Miami Dolphins, New Orleans Saints, and Kansas City Chiefs, and reverted to the practice squad after each game. On December 12, 2020, Holder was promoted to the active roster. On February, 2, 2021, the Broncos waived Holder.

Detroit Lions
On May 17, 2021, Holder signed with the Detroit Lions. He was waived on August 30, 2021.

Houston Gamblers
Holder signed with the Houston Gamblers of the United States Football League on April 28, 2022.

Seattle Sea Dragons
The Seattle Sea Dragons selected Holder in the ninth round of the 2023 XFL Supplemental Draft on January 1, 2023.

References

External links
Stanford Cardinal bio

1996 births
Living people
Sportspeople from Oceanside, California
Players of American football from California
American football cornerbacks
Stanford Cardinal football players
Denver Broncos players
Detroit Lions players
Houston Gamblers (2022) players
Seattle Sea Dragons players